Hands of Love may refer to:

"Hands of Love", an award-winning episode from American television series The Man and the City
"Hands of Love", one in a medley of songs by Paul McCartney and Wings from Red Rose Speedway
"Hands of Love", a song by Wall of Voodoo from Call of the West
"Hands of Love", a song by Crowder from Neon Steeple
"Hands of Love", a song by Miley Cyrus from Freeheld Original Motion Picture